Pavel Chernov (born 30 January 1990) is a Russian professional ice hockey player. He is currently playing with Shakhter Soligorsk of the Belarusian Extraleague (BLR).

Playing career
Chernov played with HC Vityaz Podolsk of the Kontinental Hockey League (KHL) during the 2012–13 season.

After five seasons with Severstal Cherepovets, Chernov returned to Vityaz Podolsk as a free agent, in securing a two-year contract on May 4, 2018.

On 3 August 2020, Chernov joined Latvian based KHL club, Dinamo Riga, on a one-year contract.

References

External links

1990 births
Living people
Atlant Moscow Oblast players
Dinamo Riga players
Russian ice hockey forwards
People from Navapolatsk
Severstal Cherepovets players
HC Spartak Moscow players
HC Vityaz players